The Captive Virgins (Filipino: Mga Bilanggong Birhen) is a controversial 1977 Philippine period drama film produced by Armida Siguion-Reyna and directed by Mario O'Hara and Romy Suzara. The movie served as a commentary on the state of the Philippines in the 1920s during the American colonial period.

The film was restored in 4K high-definition by the ABS-CBN Film Archives through the facilities of Central Digital Lab in Makati as part of the Centennial Year of the Philippine Cinema. For overseas releases, the film's title is renamed as Familia Sagrada.

Synopsis 
It's 1923. Under the competent leadership of Capitan Pablo, the dormant revolutionary, the "Pulajanes", re-entered to stop the abuse of landowners as agricultural injustice brings poverty under the US-controlled Philippines. The rich are weakened by their own abuse. Some poor people learn to betray. Love is sacrificed as relationships don't mean things. War is war and it costs money. Therefore, women are captives of war.

Plot
It was 1898 in one province in the Visayas region, the people began rebelling against the Spaniards towards its independence and the story begins at the Sagrada household, while Felipa is playing the piano, a man silently intrudes the house and looks at her infant son sleeping on his bed. However, when their house helper returns, he kidnapped the baby and they left. Twenty-two years later, the year 1920, the Americans became the colonizer of the country but the dreams of an independent Philippines have not yet been forgotten. On the other side, the Pulajanes have revived and they began to instigate violence against the landowning clans.

On that day, a group of Pulajanes ambushed the anti-revolutionary army and this was witnessed by Celina and her family who were returned from Manila.

Cast 
Alma Moreno as Celina
Trixia Gomez as Milagros
Armida Siguion-Reyna as Felipa
Rez Cortez as David
Leroy Salvador as Señor Juan
Mario Montenegro as Captain Pablo
Monang Carvajal
Ronnie Lazaro as Hermes
Rodel Naval

Production 
According to the memoir "Armida" by Monique Villonco, Mga Bilanggong Birhen was shot in the town of Bacolor in the province of Pampanga. In housing the film's cast and staff, they initially wanted to rent the residents' houses for them but it never materialized, citing a lack of financial budget. Later on, they decided to rent the house of Charlie Valdes, the classmate of Armida's husband Leonardo Siguion-Reyna, where they spent three weeks in the said place during its shooting period. Leonardo Siguion-Reyna was also responsible for bringing an old car, which belonged to the late industrialist Andres Soriano, to the town of Bacolor. Laida Lim Perez was assigned to design the film's main set.

Release 
The film was premiered on December 24, 1977, as part of the 1977 Metro Manila Film Festival.

Digital restoration 
The film was restored by ABS-CBN Film Restoration and Central Digital Lab in Makati, Metro Manila. Reyna Films, the film production company owned and operated by Armida's son Carlos Siguion-Reyna and his wife Bibeth Orteza, provided the 35mm master negatives and sound negatives for the 1977 movie Mga Bilanggong Birhen.

The restored version of the film was premiered at Cinema '76 Film Society in San Juan, Metro Manila. The film was attended by the film's co-director Romy Suzara, lead actress Alma Moreno, and cinematographer Romy Vitug. Actress Jobelle Salvador, the daughter of Leroy Salvador; producer Bibeth Orteza, daughter-in-law of Armida Siguion-Reyna; and Tess Carvajal, the granddaughter of Monang Carvajal also attended to represent the cast and crew.

Controversy 
The film was left unfinished when Mario O'Hara left the production before the shooting ended, following a misunderstanding between Armida and the director. Eventually, director Romy V. Suzara decided to finish the remaining parts of the film. During the film's post-production, Lino Brocka, who has a role in the film, demanded to the actress-producer to remove his scenes except the integral scene with the young Alma Moreno.

References

External links 

Philippine drama films
Tagalog-language films
Films set in 1923
Films directed by Mario O'Hara
Films directed by Romy Suzara